Sanaoud Baad Kalil is a 2013 Syrian drama television series. It was first aired in Ramadan, and the filming location is in Lebanon.

Plot
Spin the conditions of the series in the social context, where Najib decides to leave his home in Damascus because of deteriorating health conditions and travels to Lebanon for circumstances in the country to discover that his children are far away from life that he thinks they live.

The series is social drama most of events in Lebanon, His stars are six brothers and his father is Najib that came from Damascus.

Cast
Duraid Lahham as Najib
Takla Chamoun
Bassel Khayyat as Kareem
Abed Fahed as Sami
Naji Makhoul
Hasan Hamdan
Ouday Raad
Ali Tahan
Pierre Dagher
Kosai Khauli as Fouad
Kinda Alloush
Sulafa Memar
Rafi Wahbi as Raji
Nadine Al Rassi as Dina

References

http://www.imdb.com/title/tt4588160/
http://www.layalina.com/content/0-موت-نجيب-وحيداً-في-الحلقة-الأخيرة-من-مسلسل-سنعود-بعد-قليل
http://www.bostah.com/الأخبار/ملخص-أحداث-مسلسل-سنعود-بعد-قليل-بتوقيع-رافي-وهبي-والليث-حجو.html
http://www.al-akhbar.com/node/187644
http://www.elcinema.com/work/2021149

External links

Syrian drama television series
2010s in Syria